False Evidence is a 1937 British crime film directed by Donovan Pedelty and starring Gwenllian Gill, George Pembroke and Michael Hogarth. It was made as a quota quickie at Wembley Studios.

Cast
 Gwenllian Gill as Judy Endale  
 George Pembroke as John Massiter  
 Michael Hogarth as Gerald Wickham  
 Daphne Raglan as Annabelle Stirling  
 George Pughe as Tom Vanderlam  
 Francis Roberts as Inspector Jones  
 Langley Howard as Julius Wickham  
 Ralph Michael as Police Constable Barlow

References

Bibliography
 Chibnall, Steve. Quota Quickies: The Birth of the British 'B' Film. British Film Institute, 2007.
 Low, Rachael. Filmmaking in 1930s Britain. George Allen & Unwin, 1985.
 Wood, Linda. British Films, 1927-1939. British Film Institute, 1986.

External links

1937 films
British crime films
1937 crime films
Films directed by Donovan Pedelty
Quota quickies
Films shot at Wembley Studios
British black-and-white films
1930s English-language films
1930s British films